Shandon Harkeem Baptiste (born 8 April 1998) is a Grenadian professional footballer who plays as a midfielder for  club Brentford. He is a product of the Reading and Oxford United academies and began his senior career with the latter club in 2017. He transferred to Brentford in 2020. Baptiste was capped by Grenada at international level.

Club career

Oxford United

Early years 
A midfielder, Baptiste began his youth career with Reading at the age of seven and deemed "too small" by the club, he was released at age 15. After a spell in park football and the John Madejski Academy, Baptiste undertook a scholarship with Oxford United in September 2015. Despite suffering two successive dislocated shoulder injuries during the 2016–17 season, he signed a six-month professional contract in May 2017, which commenced in August 2017. Baptiste made two EFL Trophy appearances during the first half of the 2017–18 season and in December 2017 he signed a new 18-month contract, with the option of a further year. On 22 December 2017, Baptiste joined National League South club Hampton & Richmond Borough on a one-month loan, which was later extended until the end of the 2017–18 season. He made 23 appearances in a season which ended in defeat on penalties to Braintree Town in the National League South play-off Final.

2018–19 
Baptiste began the 2018–19 League One season as a regular in the team and scored his first senior goal in a 3–0 EFL Cup second-round victory over Newport County on 28 August 2018. After his sixth appearance of the season, he signed a four-year contract extension. Baptiste missed two months with a third shoulder dislocation and upon his return in January 2019, he suffered a season-ending anterior cruciate ligament injury during an FA Cup third round match versus Brentford. He made 14 appearances and scored one goal during the 2018–19 season.

2019–20 
Baptiste returned to full training in early August 2019 and was a virtual ever-present for the club through the first half of the 2019–20 season. He was heavily involved in the Us' run to the quarter finals of the EFL Cup, scoring in a 4–0 victory over Premier League club West Ham United in the third round and captaining the team versus Manchester City in the quarter-finals. Baptiste made 27 appearances and scored four goals during the 2019–20 season, before departing the club on 31 January 2020. During  seasons as a professional at the Kassam Stadium, Baptiste made 43 appearances and scored five goals.

Brentford

2020–2021 
On 31 January 2020, Baptiste transferred to Championship club Brentford for an undisclosed fee (reported to be £2.25 million, plus add-ons) and signed a -year contract, with the option of a further year. He made 13 appearances during what remained of the 2019–20 season, which ended with defeat in the 2020 Championship play-off Final. Baptiste began the 2020–21 season principally involved in Brentford's EFL Cup campaign, before suffering a tear to his lateral meniscus in a match versus West Bromwich Albion on 22 September 2020, which ultimately required surgery. In his absence, Brentford secured promotion to the Premier League with victory in the 2021 Championship play-off Final.

2021–22 
Baptiste entered the 2021–22 pre-season fully fit and made his return to match play as a second half substitute in a 1–0 friendly win over AFC Wimbledon on 17 July 2021, though an ankle injury ruled him out of the beginning of the regular season. Baptiste made his first competitive appearance in 11 months as a late substitute in a 1–1 Premier League draw with Aston Villa on 28 August 2021. 29 minutes into his fifth appearance of the season (a 2–1 victory over West Ham United on 3 October), Baptiste suffered a dislocated left shoulder, which kept him out for seven weeks. He played much of the remainder of the season in a substitute role and scored his first goal for the club in a 2–2 draw with Leeds United on 5 December. Baptiste finished the 2021–22 season with 25 appearances and one goal.

2022–23 
Baptiste was utilised primary as a substitute during the early months of the 2022–23 season, before a groin injury suffered in late October 2022 sidelined him for three months.

International career
In November 2014, Baptiste was included in the English Schools' U18 squad for a development weekend at Lilleshall. Three years later and having graduated to professional football, he made three friendly appearances for Grenada during the 2017–18 season and scored one goal. Baptiste was named in the squad for four 2019–20 CONCACAF Nations League qualifying matches in September 2019, but later declined the call up, in order to maintain his potential eligibility for England.

Style of play
Baptiste is a box-to-box midfielder and has been described as "energetic, great on the ball and works very hard pressing".

Personal life 
Baptiste was born in Grenada and moved to England at the age of three.

Career statistics

Club

International

Scores and results list Grenada's goal tally first, score column indicates score after each Baptiste goal.

References

External links
 
 Shandon Baptiste at brentfordfc.com
Shandon Baptiste at oufc.co.uk
Shandon Baptiste at grenadafa.com

1998 births
Living people
Grenadian footballers
Grenada international footballers
English footballers
Grenadian emigrants to England
Association football midfielders
Oxford United F.C. players
Hampton & Richmond Borough F.C. players
English Football League players
Brentford F.C. players
Premier League players
National League (English football) players